Hans von Andorf (1570–1600) was a Danish architect. He supervised the rebuilding works at Kronborg.

See also
List of Danish architects

1570 births
1600 deaths
Danish architects